William Vincent Shannon (August 24, 1927 – September 27, 1988) was an American journalist, author, and United States Ambassador to Ireland from 1977 to 1981 under President Jimmy Carter.

Biography
Born in Worcester, Massachusetts, Shannon earned a bachelor's degree from Clark University in 1947, and a master's degree in history from Harvard University in 1948.

From 1951 to 1964, Shannon was a Washington correspondent and columnist for the New York Post, and from 1964 until 1977, he was an editorial writer for The New York Times. He also authored the books The American Irish: A Political and Social Portrait (1964), The Heir Apparent (1967), and They Could Not Trust the King (1974). He was coauthor of The Truman Merry-Go-Round (1950) and published many articles.

Shannon served on the board of directors of the American Irish Foundation. In 1975 he received the Gold Medal of the Éire Society of Boston for service to literature. He was an associate fellow of Yale University's Morse College from 1966, and in 1961–62 was fellow-in-residence at the Center for the Study of Democratic Institutions in Santa Barbara, California.

In 1977, Shannon was appointed ambassador to Ireland by President Carter. After confirmation by the Senate, he presented his credentials to Irish leaders on July 20, 1977, and had the official title of Ambassador Extraordinary and Plenipotentiary. He served as ambassador until June 7, 1981.

In 1981, Shannon joined Boston University and taught an American Presidency course and conducted graduate seminars in journalism; he also wrote for The Boston Globe. Shannon died in Boston in 1988 of lymphoma, at age 61. Boston University established the William V. Shannon Memorial Fellowships in his memory, to benefit Irish citizens pursuing graduate study at the university.

Works

References

Further reading

External links
 
 

American newspaper editors
Deaths from lymphoma
1927 births
1988 deaths
Clark University alumni
Harvard University alumni
20th-century American non-fiction writers
Ambassadors of the United States to Ireland